Gustav "Egon" or "Erwin" Pollak (12 November 1898 – 21 January 1981) was an Austrian-born footballer who played for the famed SC Hakoah Wien (a.k.a. Hakoah Vienna). He was also the first ever manager of the Israel national football team in their 3–1 loss to the United States just after gaining independence.

Early life
Egon Erwin Pollak was born in Vienna, Austria, to a Jewish family.

Club career
Pollak began his career with SC Hakoah Wien in the Austrian League.  In 1926, he moved to the United States where he played a single season with the New York Giants of the American Soccer League.

References

External links
 jewsinsports.org

1898 births
1984 deaths
Jewish Austrian sportspeople
Jewish footballers
Austrian footballers
Austria international footballers
SC Hakoah Wien footballers
New York Giants (soccer) players
American Soccer League (1921–1933) players
Austrian football managers
Israel national football team managers
Expatriate soccer players in the United States
Austrian expatriate sportspeople in Israel
Austrian expatriate sportspeople in the United States
Footballers from Vienna
Association football defenders